The 1964–65 Norwegian 1. Divisjon season was the 26th season of ice hockey in Norway. Six teams participated in the league, and Valerenga Ishockey won the championship.

Regular season

External links 
 Norwegian Ice Hockey Federation

Nor
GET-ligaen seasons
1964 in Norwegian sport
1965 in Norwegian sport